Josef Ladislav Píč (January 19, 1847 in Mšeno near Mělník – December 19, 1911 in Prague) was Czech archaeologist and paleontologist, one of founders of modern Czech archaeology.

Píč studied history and Slavic languages at the Charles University in Prague (then called Karl-Ferdinand University). In 1883, he became docent of history at the university. Since 1893, he was named custodian and later director of archeologic collection at the National Museum (then named České museum) in Prague. Píč created and maintained collection prehistoric artefacts. His major literary work was Starožitnosti země české (1899–1909), in three parts, about ancient history of Czech lands.

Exhaustion, conflicts with colleagues about his work and involvement in fights over validity of Rukopis královédvorský a zelenohorský drove him to suicide.

Czech archaeologists
Czech paleontologists
1847 births
1911 suicides
Suicides by firearm in the Czech Republic
Charles University alumni
1911 deaths